Events from the year 1880 in Denmark.

Incumbents
 Monarch – Christian IX
 Prime minister – J. B. S. Estrup

Events

 16 April  The Vega Expedition calls at Copenhagen. 
 18 April  A banquet is held for Nordenskiöld and the other members of the Vega Expedition in the Great Hall of Børsen in Copenhagen.

Undated

Sports
 26 September  Aarhus Gymnastikforening is founded.

Births
 Niels Bukh (1880-1950) - Bukh was a famed gymnastics coach who brought a provocative, masculine style to the sport and led the winning Olympic teams. He is also known for supporting the Nazi Party, and as a homosexual he was, "discreetly threatened with exposure and agreed to put a halt to his public endorsement of Nazism."

Deaths
 29 March – Constantin Hansen, painter (born 1804 in Denmark)
 6 April  Louise Westergaard, pedagogue and educator (born 1826)

References

 
1880s in Denmark
Denmark
Years of the 19th century in Denmark